Sophon is a Thai masculine given name from Pali: . People with the name include:

Sophon Hayachanta, footballer
Sophon Ratanakorn, judge
Sophon Suphapong, business executive and senator

Thai masculine given names